Inara or INARA may refer to:

 Inara (Casablanca), neighbourhood in Casablanca, Morocco
 Inara George (born 1974), American singer-songwriter
 Inara (goddess), Hittite-Hurrian deity
 Inara Melon (Acanthosicyos horridus)
 Ināra Mūrniece (born 1970), speaker of the twelfth Latvian Saeima
 Inara Serra, Firefly television series character
 Iran Nuclear Agreement Review Act of 2015
 International Network for Aid, Relief and Assistance, an American humanitarian organisation